A Soulful Christmas is the ninth studio album of keyboardist Brian Culbertson released in 2006 on GRP Records. The album reached No. 17 on the Billboard Contemporary Jazz Albums chart and No. 7 on the Billboard Top Jazz Albums chart.

Tracklisting

References

2006 albums
GRP Records albums